Vakat je...  (Its about time...) is the first studio album by Bosnian rock band Zona Iskljuchenja, released on July 7, 2006, by Hayat Production. The album was released after 11 years since the foundation of the band, thus the symbolic title "Its about time...".

Material was recorded in three different studios during the long period of time, therefore various music genre and different influences could be noticed while listening. "Appearance of Zona Iskljuchenja with "Vakat je..." is the most beautiful rock story coming from the province" - said Milan Sokolivic from the Federalni Radio in the long radio interview with the band on December 22, 2016.

The band released two music videos from this albums for the songs "Ljubav" ("Love") and "Lijepa moja' ("My Beautiful")  and made significant breakthrough on the Bosnian rock scene. The album contains 10 songs with relatively various music genre and was considered to be the breakthrough point for the albums to come. Vakat je... became the first studio album released by any music band from Gorazde.

Track listing

References

External links
 Vakat je at Discogs.com
 Zona Iskljuchenja- Official Youtube Channel
 Zona Iskljuchenja - Twitter Official
 Zona Iskljuchenja - Soundcloud Official
 Zona Iskljuchenja - Facebook page

2006 albums